Zinda Dil is a 1975 Bollywood film directed by Sikandar Khanna. The film stars Rishi Kapoor, Rajesh Leher and Neetu Singh in the lead roles.

Plot summary
This is the story of two brothers and a father. The brothers are twins Arun Sharma (played by Rishi Kapoor) and Kewal Sharma (Actor Rajesh Leher, look-alike of Rishi Kapoor, who also played lead role in the film Subh Din of Rajshri Productions), and the father is Major Hemraj Sharma (Pran), a war veteran who became disabled in the last war, and has to rely on crutches to walk. The Major has a soft corner for Kewal, but shows open disapproval of Arun, thus alienating him. He constantly asks Arun to make sacrifices for Kewal, including giving up his love, Rekha (Zaheera). Heartbroken Arun leaves his father's home and meets an old acquaintance who he had saved from committing suicide, Jyoti (Neetu Singh). Jyoti gets Arun a job at her dad's (Pinchoo Kapoor) Diwan Pratap chand's hotel. Here Arun meets with a hotel waiter who tells him that his mother is still alive. Arun is shocked to note this and asks his mother to accompany him to confront his father. Was Arun's father really that cold-hearted to let go of his wife, and keep this secret from his sons?

Songs
"Nahi Nahi Jana Nahi Abhi Nahi" - Lata Mangeshkar
"Zindagi Jindadili Ka Nam Hai" - Mohammed Rafi
"O Meri Jan By God Mai Teri Life Banadunga" - Kishore Kumar
"Sham Suhani Ayi Khusiya Banke Pahli Bar" - Mahendra Kapoor, Shailendra Singh, Lata Mangeshkar

Cast
 Rishi Kapoor as Arun Sharma 
 Rajesh Leher as Kewal Sharma
 Neetu Singh as Jyoti Pratap Chand
 Zaheera as Rekha
 Pran as Major Hemraj Sharma
 Raj Mehra as Rekha's dad
 I. S. Johar as Pinto D'souza / Daya Shankar
 Roopesh Kumar as Ghanshyam Thakur
 Pinchoo Kapoor as Diwan Pratap Chand
 Padma Chavan as Parvati

References

External links
 

1975 films
1970s Hindi-language films
Films scored by Laxmikant–Pyarelal